Isoptericola cucumis is a Gram-positive and aerobic bacterium from the genus Isoptericola which has been isolated from a cucumber (Cucumis sativus) in Auburn, Alabama, in the United States.

References 

Micrococcales
Bacteria described in 2016